Greatest Hits is the first and only compilation album by American country music group The Forester Sisters. It was released in 1989 via Warner Bros. Records. It includes the singles "Don't You" and "Leave It Alone".

Track listing

Charts

References

1989 compilation albums
The Forester Sisters albums
Albums produced by Barry Beckett
Albums produced by Emory Gordy Jr.
Albums produced by Jim Ed Norman
Albums produced by James Stroud
Warner Records compilation albums